Yumin ( unless otherwise noted) may refer to these places in China:

Yumin County, a county in northern Xinjiang
Yumin Township (育民乡), a township in Yushu, Jilin
Yumin, Sichuan, a town in Yuechi County, Sichuan

Subdistricts
Yumin Subdistrict, Harbin, in Hulan District, Harbin, Heilongjiang
Yumin Subdistrict, Qingtongxia, in Qingtongxia, Ningxia

Name
Zheng Yumin (born 1967), Chinese badminton player

See also
Yu Min (disambiguation)